Chingiz Turpal-Eliyevich Magomadov (born 1 August 1998) is a Russian football player who plays as a right-back for FC Volga Ulyanovsk on loan from FC Ural Yekaterinburg.

Club career
He made his debut in the Russian Professional Football League for FC Terek-2 Grozny on 24 May 2016 in a game against PFC Spartak Nalchik.

In late January 2019 he signed with FC Ural Yekaterinburg. He made his debut for the main squad of Ural on 25 September 2019 in a Russian Cup game against FC Chernomorets Novorossiysk. He made his Russian Premier League debut for Ural on 22 July 2020 in a game against FC Lokomotiv Moscow, as a starter.

On 2 July 2021, he was loaned to FC KAMAZ Naberezhnye Chelny. On 10 January 2022, KAMAZ announced that Magomadov returned to Ural.

On 11 July 2022, Magomadov was loaned to FC Volga Ulyanovsk.

Career statistics

References

External links
 
 
 
 Profile by Russian Professional Football League

1998 births
People from Kurchaloyevsky District
Sportspeople from Chechnya
Living people
Russian footballers
Association football midfielders
FC Akhmat Grozny players
PFC Spartak Nalchik players
FC Ural Yekaterinburg players
FC KAMAZ Naberezhnye Chelny players
FC Volga Ulyanovsk players
Russian Premier League players
Russian First League players
Russian Second League players